Lee Chae-rin  (born February 26, 1991), better known by her stage name CL, is a South Korean rapper and singer-songwriter. Born in Seoul, South Korea, she spent much of her early life in Japan and France. CL trained at JYP Entertainment before joining YG Entertainment at the age of fifteen. She debuted and rose to fame as a member of the girl group 2NE1 in 2009, which went on to become one of the best-selling girl groups of all-time. As a solo artist, CL made her debut with the single "The Baddest Female" in May 2013 and released the solo track "MTBD" in February 2014 as part of 2NE1's final studio album Crush.

Following the group's hiatus at the turn of 2015, CL pursued a solo career with the release of the standalone singles "Hello Bitches" (2015) and "Lifted" (2016). The latter single led CL to become the first female Korean solo artist to place onto the Billboard Hot 100, and the third Korean artist to do so overall. In November 2016, YG announced the disbandment of 2NE1 after nearly two years of hiatus, and CL subsequently remained under the label. Shortly after leaving YG in December 2019, she released her solo EP project In the Name of Love (2019), consisting of six tracks written during the three years since her previous single "Lifted". Her debut studio album, Alpha, was released in October 2021.

Known for experimentation across music styles as well as her live performances, CL is regarded as an influential figure in the international spread of the Korean wave. Beyond the field of music, she is recognized as a style icon by numerous publications worldwide.

Biography

1991–2008: Early life and career beginnings
Lee Chae-rin was born in Seoul, South Korea, but spent most of her childhood living in Paris, Tsukuba, and Tokyo. When she was 13, she moved to Paris alone where she studied for two years. On living in different cities while growing up, CL said, "Culturally, I'm not 100 percent Korean. I'm very mixed, and very open." When she was 15, CL auditioned to join South Korean record label YG Entertainment. Her first feature on a song recording was Big Bang's "Intro (Hot Issue)" in 2007. Later that year, Lee performed for the first time on stage at Seoul Broadcasting System's Gayo Daejeon alongside her label mates. Her first credited appearance in a song was in 2008, with Uhm Jung-hwa's "DJ," in which she rapped.

2009–2013: Debut with 2NE1 and solo career beginnings

Lee took on the stage name 'CL' and was placed as the leader and main rapper of 2NE1, alongside Bom, Sandara Park and Minzy. The group then collaborated with label-mates BigBang for the song "Lollipop" on March 27, 2009, before appearing on SBS's The Music Trend for the first time on May 17, where they performed their official debut single "Fire". 2NE1 achieved significant success with their number-one single "I Don't Care" from their first extended play, 2NE1, which won them the "Song of the Year" accolade at the 2009 Mnet Asian Music Awards, making them the first rookie group to win a daesang in the same year of debut.

In August 2009, she collaborated with label-mates G-Dragon and Teddy Park of 1TYM for the single "The Leaders", featured on G-Dragon's first solo album, Heartbreaker. The same month, after the group finished with "I Don't Care" promotions, CL collaborated with fellow member Minzy for "Please Don't Go," which charted at number six on the Gaon Chart by the end of November. Her first solo single, "The Baddest Female", was released on May 28, 2013. For 2NE1's second album Crush, CL wrote the lyrics and co-composed the music for the tracks "Crush", "If I Were You", and "Baby I Miss You". She also wrote the lyrics for her solo track "MTBD", as well as the track "Scream".

2014–2018: Stand-alone singles and featured appearances
In October 2014, it was announced that CL was planning to debut as a solo artist the following year in the United States, teaming up with Scooter Braun as her manager. In May 2015, she featured in Diplo's single "Doctor Pepper", alongside Riff Raff and OG Maco. In November 2015, CL released her first single "Hello Bitches", as a teaser for her initially planned EP Lifted. She was also featured on labelmate Psy's single "Daddy". The song debuted at number 97 on the Billboard Hot 100, earning her first entry on the chart. The single, "Lifted" was released on August 19, 2016. The song appeared in the Top 30 of iTunes' Hip-Hop/Rap chart within three hours of being released, peaking at number 21. It primary incorporates samples of Wu-Tang Clan's 1993 track "Method Man", and had the rapper himself appear in the accompanying music video. Time magazine referred to her as one of the biggest stars in Asia, and called her the "Future of K-pop in America". "Lifted" went on to peak at number 94 on the Billboard Hot 100, earning her first entry as a solo artist and second overall, making her the first female South Korean soloist to appear on the chart. On October 29, 2016, CL kicked off her first North American tour, the Hello Bitches Tour, at New York City's Hammerstein Ballroom. With the sold-out performance, she became the first K-pop female artist to hold a solo concert in the city. The tour visited various other cities in the United States and Canada before concluding in Toronto on November 14.

Alongside Shaiana, she was featured on Lil Yachty's song "Surrender", an exclusive track off of the Target deluxe edition of his album Teenage Emotions, released on May 26, 2017. CL also recorded an original soundtrack single titled "No Better Feelin'" for the My Little Pony: The Movie soundtrack, released on September 22, 2017. On January 4, 2018, she was reported to make her Hollywood debut as an actress in Peter Berg's film Mile 22 that stars Mark Wahlberg. On February 25, 2018, CL performed at the 2018 Winter Olympics closing ceremony at Pyeongchang Olympic Stadium, performing parts of "The Baddest Female" and the 2NE1 global hit "I Am the Best". At the closing ceremony, she met with South Korean President Moon Jae-in, First Lady Kim Jung-sook, Exo, and Ivanka Trump, daughter of US President Donald Trump. In July of the same year, the Olympics channel included CL's performance in their list of Top 10 Olympic Live Music Performances of All Time, ranking at number 8. In October, CL collaborated with Black Eyed Peas on the track "Dopeness" along the accompanying music video.

2019–present: Departure from YG Entertainment, In the Name of Love and Alpha
On November 8, 2019, YG Entertainment announced that CL did not renew her contract with the company and left the label. On December 4, shortly after leaving YG, she began releasing previously unreleased tracks for her digital solo EP project In the Name of Love for three consecutive weeks. On September 12, 2020, CL announced that she had been working on a new album that would be released later that year. Two days later, she released the music video for the song "Post Up", which would serve as the intro track for her upcoming album. On October 29, she released two singles—"Hwa" and "5 Star"—which were co-written by former labelmate Tablo. At the same time, CL announced that her first full-length album Alpha would be released on November 30. However, on November 16, she announced that she had decided to postpone the album release until early 2021, stating that while preparing the album she had developed new ideas.

On February 26, 2021, CL released "Wish You Were Here", which coincided with her 30th birthday, released as a tribute to her mother who had died days prior on February 10 due to a heart attack. On June 16, CL appeared in the first episode of the second season of the TV series Dave, where she played the role of herself collaborating with rapper Lil Dicky as he aspires to take over the K-pop industry. On July 10, 2021, CL signed a domestic management contract with Konnect Entertainment in order to manage her activities in Korea. Two weeks later, domestic publications reported that CL would make her comeback in mid-August. It was later announced that CL would release her album Alpha on October 20, 2021. The digital single "Spicy" was first released on August 24. On September 13, she became the first K-pop female musician to attend the fashion exhibition Met Gala in New York City, alongside Blackpink's Rosé, wearing a custom made hanbok-inspired denim dress designed by Alexander Wang. Four days later, CL announced that Alpha's second digital single "Lover Like Me" would be released on September 29. On June 2, 2022, CL made her voice acting debut with the role of Shaki L for the animation Baby Shark's Big Show!. In November 2022, CL was chosen as GQ Koreas Woman of the Year.

Artistry
CL has cited 1TYM leader Teddy Park—who produced much of 2NE1's music throughout their career—as a source of influence and inspiration. In addition, she has attributed Madonna, Queen, and Lauryn Hill as role models for their unique styles and influence as well as their levels of originality. Her discography primarily consists of hip hop, dance, and electronic styles, as well as integrating a variety of other genres. Her debut solo single "The Baddest Female" in 2013 was characterized as "a clattering ego massage that channelled Atlanta hip-hop", combining techno and dance elements with the catchphrase "Now do the unnie". The track jumps from a hip-hop beat to an electronica-infused build-up to the dubstep breakdown during the bridge. Her next solo track, "MTBD", was included as part of 2NE1's second studio album Crush (2014) and fused the genres of EDM, hip-pop and bubblegum trap over a tense drum beat, low bass, and a unique synth sound. Billboard stated that: "The beat was trendy yet fresh, employing of-the-moment, trap-inspired breakdowns" and highlighted her "fierce and playful rap and singing style." Fuse TV compared it to the musical styles of DJ Snake's "Turn Down for What", and deemed "MTBD" an upgraded version of the track.

CL continued to pursue hip-hop and electronic styles with the release of "Hello Bitches" in 2015, which featured instrumentations of synthesizers, a heavy 808 bassline, and a strong trap hip-hop beat as the main axis. Her 2016 English-language single "Lifted" marked her entry into reggae fusion, and was characterized as a relatively minimal breezy tropical hip-hop track. Following a period of inactivity, CL released the project EP In the Name of Love in December 2019. Featuring six tracks, Billboard noted that the EP "[shares] a bit of herself, and her past, through its reflective tunes." Stylistically, the record explores a variety of music genres from R&B to rap and tropical dance. In October 2020, CL released the track "Hwa", which references the national flower of South Korea. Rolling Stone commented that "CL's rapping prowess is on full display", as she rides a "booming bass line and snappy snares." The song reflects her individuality, referencing themes of fire, wealth, flower and change. In the track "5 Star", it contrasts the styles of "Hwa" with its love-filled lyrics and channels a more pop vibe.

Public image and impact 

An anomaly in the mainstream K-pop scene, as The Guardian describes, CL has been called "a bold and brash personality in a world of high-gloss uniformity". Noted for deviating from stereotypical trends throughout her career, Jeff Benjamin of Billboard magazine stated that "She has a more fearless mindset when it comes to her career that's not seen in most K-pop stars." Regarding her live performances, Tamar Herman of the same publication stating that she "dominate[s] stage after stage with her charismatic presence". Owen Meyers highlighted her charismatic character and stated that "she helped pave the way for K-pop's explosion." In an interview with CNN at New York Fashion Week 2016, fashion designer Jeremy Scott added: "I go around the world, I've seen her fans in Chile, in Brazil, obviously all through Europe. [...] She's not just a Korean or an Asian phenomenon, she really is a global superstar".

Hailed as the "ultimate style queen" in South Korea by Dazed, CL's influence extends beyond music into the fashion industry. Regarded as a style icon and a fashion industry figure, she has been known to experiment with a variety of fashion trends and styles throughout her career. She holds connections with several internationally renowned designers, including Jeremy Scott, Marc Jacobs, and Karl Lagerfeld and is often seen wearing and attending events for fashion houses such as Chanel, Saint Laurent, Fendi, Moschino, Givenchy, Balmain, and Alexander McQueen. Vogue magazine called her "affinity for loud, larger-than-life clothes" a "catnip for photographers during Fashion Week." Often combining clothes from luxury fashion houses with streetwear, the magazine stated that "While most front row attendees show up in something from the corresponding brand," CL chooses "something that complements not just the aesthetic of the house, but also perfectly encapsulates her own 'baddest female' reputation." Her personal style has been described as resembling a tomboy-like aesthetic, commonly incorporating boots, biker jackets and sports caps with young menswear favorites such as Nasir Mazhar, Astrid Andersen and Sam MC. She has landed multiple covers and editorials of various fashion magazines in Korea and abroad, including for Paper, W, Elle, Vogue, Rolling Stone, Marie Claire, Dazed, and Allure. Daisy Jones of Dazed magazine stated that "her fashion status extends far beyond an avalanche of labels and designer name-checks – like Rihanna, she's an effortless risk-taker, with her eyes firmly facing the future." In an interview with i-D in 2015, CL elaborated on how fashion has influenced her career, saying: "Fashion and music are connected since both are expressions. I love to perform and express myself to inspire people. That's why fashion is a huge inspiration to me."

In 2015, CL ranked second on Time magazine's polls for Most Influential People in the World, placing her behind Russian politician Vladimir Putin. In 2016, she became the first female K-pop idol to appear on Hypebeast's list of 100 Innovators as well as the BoF 500 power list, who called CL a "South Korean force of nature" and a "pop culture phenomenon" who has been a "muse to a number of designers". Nordstrom's Trunk Club included her in their list of 15 Most Stylish Female Icons worldwide who have changed fashion in recent history, and deemed her one of the biggest female style icons in K-pop. On April 1, 2019, CL was listed by Forbes magazine as one of Asia's 30 Under 30 most influential celebrities in the field of entertainment & sports. In recognition of her stage presence and duality, The Guardian ranked her as the 19th best girl group member of all time in October 2019, and was only one of the two K-pop artists to have been mentioned. She has been called "K-pop Queen" by international publications such as Rolling Stone, Billboard, and Elle. In March 2021, she was the only Korean musician selected as part of Google's Women's History Month campaign, attributing to her unique color and "role in heralding the beginning of the golden age of K-pop".

Artists who have cited her as an influence or inspiration include Blackpink's Lisa, Loona's Hyunjin, Aespa's Giselle, GFriend's SinB, Secret Number's Jinny, Hot Issue's Hyeongshin, Lorde, (G)I-dle's Soyeon, Billlie's Moon Sua, WJSN's Exy, and Oh My Girl's Jiho. Yuji and Haeun of 3YE and Choi Yoo-jung have said that they have studied CL's performances and expressions while practicing performing. At the 2018 Winter Olympics, Korean-American snowboarding gold medalist Chloe Kim stated that "I listen to CL before I compete."

Other ventures

Endorsements
As the leader of 2NE1, CL has appeared in a number of commercials and advertisements for various prominent brands, including Nikon, Intel, Samsung, and LG. Aside from her group endorsements, CL took part as a celebrity model for luxury cosmetic company Lancôme's 'Vision of Beauties' campaign in 2011. The following year, she appeared alongside actor Lee Dong-wook in advertisements for Cass Light Beer—a company who has attracted attention with unique TV commercials—and featured the pair in a "Cyber Dance Battle" in a space and Arctic themed environment. In 2014, CL landed endorsement deals with Glacéau's Vitamin Water, KGB Lemon Vodka, and appeared alongside bandmate Minzy and Winner in Adidass #allinfordance advertising campaign. In February of that year, CL was named the face of Maybelline New York—one of the world's largest cosmetic brands—and went on to appear in multiple commercial features for their cosmetic products. Her endorsement of the Magnum Volume Express mascara soon saw a significant increase in sales, tripling the amount as compared to the previous year, and became known as the "CL mascara".

In 2017, she joined the likes of Karlie Kloss, Candace Parker, and Hannah Bronfman in Adidas's "Here to Create" movement; an official from the company cited her representation of creativeness and inspiration as the reason for her selection. In April, CL was unveiled as an endorsement model for high-end luggage manufacturer Tumi as part of their Global Citizen Campaign, where they selected several influential figures from various fields as Global Citizens. For the campaign, she travelled to Chefchaouen (The Blue City) in Morocco as an endorsement for the brand's 19 Degree collection.

Upon appearing as an advertisement model for Taco Bell in February 2021, CL became the first female solo artist from South Korea to feature in a television commercial in the United States. That May, CL became the face of Nike Korea's "Play New" advertisement campaign, where it aims to illuminate the culture of sports and inspire people to pursue new athletic goals. In June, Johnnie Walker—the world's leading distributor of Scotch whisky—introduced her as the global ambassador for the brand's 'Keep Walking' campaign, as part of its launch into Korea and other markets in Asia. In 2022, Coca-Cola Korea selected her as an endorsement model for Dr Pepper.

Fashion 
In 2013, head of Moschino Jeremy Scott selected CL as one of his muses, owing to her being "one of the fiercest girls to come out of Seoul". Because of her influence throughout Asia, CL collaborated with the luxury fashion brands Kenzo and On Pedder in 2014. While on tour with 2NE1, CL appeared at a promotional and fan-signing event for the collaboration at On Pedder's flagship store in Hong Kong. In July of the same year, CL was named the muse of upscale brand Hazzys for their 2014 F/W and 2015 S/S seasons, who cited her charisma, trendy style and appeal among the 20s and 30s age demographics a great fit for the brand's modern image. In 2016, CL became a muse for Alexander Wang; Monica Kim of Vogue deemed her a prime example of "unapologetic approach to life" and a "fearless take on hair and makeup that celebrates individuality".

In January 2020, CL became the first Korean brand ambassador for Ivy Park, an athleisure fashion line owned by Beyoncé, and appeared alongside the singer in promotional shoots for the brand's Ivy Park x Adidas collection. In June 2021, CL collaborated with French haute couture designer Jean Paul Gaultier in a pictorial for W Koreas July issue, where he directly airlifted his collection to Korea for CL.

Filmography

Film

Television shows

Discography

 Alpha (2021)

Tours
 Hello Bitches Tour (2016)

Awards and nominations

Listicles

Notes

References

External links

 Official Website

1991 births
Living people
21st-century South Korean women singers
2NE1 members
Schoolboy Records artists
South Korean female idols
K-pop singers
South Korean hip hop singers
South Korean women pop singers
South Korean women rappers
Japanese-language singers of South Korea
English-language singers from South Korea
Rappers from Seoul
South Korean dance musicians
MAMA Award winners
South Korean expatriates in the United States
South Korean hip hop record producers
Konnect Entertainment artists